Wheelchair tennis first entered the Summer Paralympic Games in 1988 as a demonstration sport. Australia has competed at every Paralympic wheelchair tennis competition.

Medalists

As of the 2008 Games.

Summer Games

1988
Australia won a silver medal.

1996

Australia won 1 silver and 1 bronze medal.

2000

Australia won 1 gold and 2 silver medals.

2004

Australia won 1 silver medal and 2 bronze medals.

References

See also

Australian Paralympic wheelchair tennis team
Wheelchair tennis at the Summer Paralympics

Paralympic wheelchair tennis players of Australia
Wheelchair tennis